Daniel P. Kessler is an American academic whose work focuses on health policy and health care finance. He is currently a professor in management at the Stanford Graduate School of Business and a professor of law at Stanford Law School. Additionally, he is professor (by courtesy) of health research and policy at the Stanford University School of Medicine.

Education 
Kessler earned his PhD in economics from the Massachusetts Institute of Technology, and his JD from Stanford Law School in 1993.

Career

Academia 
He has taught at Harvard University and the Wharton School of Business, and has served on the faculty of the Stanford Graduate School of Business since 1998. He has been awarded grants from the National Institutes of Health, the National Science Foundation and the California HealthCare Foundation, and won awards from Stanford University, the National Institute for Health Care Management Foundation, and the International Health Economics Association.

In addition to the general fields of antitrust law and law and economics, Kessler's current areas of interest are the effects of tax policy on medical spending, market-based health care reform, and the effects of vertical integration and other shared ownership structures in health service markets on cost and quality of care.

Outside academia 
Outside academia, he is a senior fellow at the Hoover Institution and a research associate at the National Bureau of Economic Research. In addition to authoring and editing books on health reform, he is a contributor to The Wall Street Journal and has been published in both popular and academic periodicals.

References

External links
 Daniel P. Kessler, Recent Publications

MIT School of Humanities, Arts, and Social Sciences alumni
Harvard University faculty
Wharton School of the University of Pennsylvania faculty
Stanford Law School faculty
Hoover Institution people
Stanford University School of Medicine faculty
Living people
Year of birth missing (living people)